Ronald Edwin Gant (born March 2, 1965) is an American television news anchor and former professional baseball outfielder, who played in Major League Baseball (MLB) for the Atlanta Braves (1987–1993), Cincinnati Reds (1995), St. Louis Cardinals (1996–1998), Philadelphia Phillies (1999–2000), Anaheim Angels (2000), Colorado Rockies (2001), Oakland Athletics (2001, 2003), and San Diego Padres (2002). Gant is currently a co-host on WAGA-TV's morning news program Good Day Atlanta.

Gant joined the 30–30 club (at least 30 stolen bases and 30 home runs in the same season) in 1990 and 1991, while with the Braves. He batted and threw right-handed.

Early life
Gant was born in Victoria, Texas to George Gant, a chemistry professor, and Alice Hardeman, a special education  teacher. Gant played football and baseball in high school. He was recruited heavily to play college baseball for such schools as Texas and Oklahoma but turned down scholarship offers to go pro after high school.

Playing career
He collected 22 hits in 83 at bats, including two home runs. During the  season, the rookie Gant was an everyday player for the struggling Braves, who finished with a record of 54–106.

Barry Bonds later eclipsed the accomplishment, qualifying for the 30-30 Club in three straight seasons, from –.

Although his home run and stolen base totals were extremely similar the following year, most of his other stats were not as good: he hit just .251 with over 100 strike outs and 23 fewer hits in just 14 fewer at bats (AB). His RBI numbers also increased to 105.

The Braves lost to the Minnesota Twins in the 1991 World Series. Gant batted .267 in the series, with four RBIs, as the Twins won it in a close and exciting seventh game. During Game 2 of the 1991 World Series, Gant had a memorable and controversial confrontation with Twins first baseman Kent Hrbek. As Gant was trying to make it back to first base to avoid Twins pitcher Kevin Tapani's pickoff, he claimed Hrbek pulled his leg off the base during the swipe tag and Gant was called out. Drew Coble, the first base umpire, ruled that Gant's momentum had carried him off the bag, and refused to change his call. Aiding the controversy the commentators at the time remarked that it appeared that Hrbek had in fact lifted Gant off the bag and that his 235-pound frame helped him lift the lighter Gant who weighs only 172 pounds. Also, New York Times writer Claire Smith wrote that "Hrbek seemed to lift Gant's leg right off the bag as the Braves' center fielder fought to keep his balance." This play caused the Braves bench to empty during the argument.

In both 1991 and 1993, he was in the top five in the league in runs batted in. His speed and power combination made him bidworthy, and the Reds and Cardinals each paid a lot for him in the mid-90s.

Before the 1992 season, Gant got into an altercation with future congressman Connie Mack IV. In , Gant made his last World Series appearance, where he got one double in eight at-bats, and the Braves lost again, this time in six games to the Toronto Blue Jays.

On September 15, 1993, during a nationally televised game on ESPN against the Cincinnati Reds, Gant hit a game-winning walk-off home run off Rob Dibble to give the Braves a come from behind victory. The Braves trailed 6–2, going into the bottom of the 9th.

Post–Braves career
The Braves ended up releasing him; he would not play again until 1995, emerging with the Cincinnati Reds before being signed by the St. Louis Cardinals in 1996.

 was the low point of Gant's career when he struck out 162 times and batted .229 for the Cardinals. After the Cardinals didn't play him full-time in 1998 (though he still hit 26 homers), he was traded by the Cardinals with Jeff Brantley and Cliff Politte to the Philadelphia Phillies for Ricky Bottalico and Garrett Stephenson on November 19.

The next year, Gant would have his last real quality season. He had 13 stolen bases and 107 runs scored, with 27 doubles and two triples, in 134 hits.

He set the lowest RBI total ever by a player with 25 or more homers (tied in 2015 by Joc Pederson, who also hit 26 home runs with 54 RBIs).

After a non-productive 2003 season with the A's, Gant retired at age 38.

In a 16-season career, Gant batted .256 with 321 home runs and 1,008 RBIs. He had 243 stolen bases and 1,080 runs scored in 1,832 games. Gant had 302 doubles and 50 triples in his career. He ended with 1,651 hits in 6,449 at-bats. Gant averaged 20 home runs, 63 RBIs, and 15 stolen bases a year. In post-season play, Gant was a .228 hitter with 8 home runs and 28 RBIs in 52 playoff games; he had 43 hits in 189 at-bats.

Broadcasting

During the 2005 Major League Baseball season, Gant worked as a color commentator for the Atlanta Braves on TBS. He also worked as an analyst on SportSouth during Braves games and on the MLB Network.

On October 25, 2012, he became a news anchor for the Atlanta Fox owned-and-operated station WAGA-TV, co-hosting the morning show Good Day Atlanta.

Personal life
In 1992, Gant was involved in a bar fight in Georgia with Connie Mack IV, the great-grandson of Hall of Famer Connie Mack. Mack suffered a broken ankle in the fight but a jury ultimately found that Gant was not responsible for Mack's injuries.

In February 2005, Gant was involved in a fatal car accident when his sport utility vehicle collided with a pickup truck in Fulton County, Georgia, killing the truck's driver.

In June 2005, Gant and his wife assisted the Office of the Attorney General of Georgia and the Georgia Bureau of Investigation in setting up a sting operation which resulted in the arrest of six different people for charges related to mortgage fraud involving the sale of the family's Alpharetta home. The state alleged the scheme would have netted the fraudsters a profit of more than $800,000.

, Gant lived in Suwanee, Georgia. He has four children: a son and three daughters.

See also
 List of Major League Baseball career home run leaders
 List of Major League Baseball career runs scored leaders
 List of Major League Baseball career runs batted in leaders
 List of Major League Baseball career stolen bases leaders
 30–30 club

References

External links

1965 births
Living people
African-American baseball players
Anaheim Angels players
Anderson Braves players
Atlanta Braves announcers
Atlanta Braves players
Baseball players from Texas
Cincinnati Reds players
Colorado Rockies players
Criollos de Caguas players
Durham Bulls players
Greenville Braves players
Gulf Coast Braves players
Major League Baseball broadcasters
Major League Baseball left fielders
MLB Network personalities
National League All-Stars
Oakland Athletics players
Baseball players from Atlanta
People from Victoria, Texas
Philadelphia Phillies players
Richmond Braves players
San Diego Padres players
St. Louis Cardinals players
Sumter Braves players
Silver Slugger Award winners
21st-century African-American people
20th-century African-American sportspeople